The Source is a 1862 oil painting done by Gustave Courbet, a French artist. The painting shows a nude woman standing outside in nature, in a body of water.

Description
The Source is a oil painting of a nude woman standing in front of a stream of water. In the painting the woman is reaching into the stream while it is flowing unto her arms. The identity of the woman in the painting is unknown. There was some speculation on whether or not the woman had previously modeled for Courbet. Some say she modeled for Courbet twice, others say she only modeled for Courbet one time.

Inspiration 
Many people believe that Courbet’s The Source painting was inspired by the 1856 oil painting, The Source. It was  created by Jean-Auguste-Dominique Ingres'. Both paintings show fully nude women and share similar nature scenes. Courbet’s painting has also been compared to The Moon and The Earth painting done by Paul Gauguin in 1893. 

Courbet’s Painting is currently being held at the Metropolitan Museum of Art.

References

Further reading
Catalogue of the European Paintings in the Metropolitan Museum of Art, including The Source

1862 paintings
Paintings in the collection of the Metropolitan Museum of Art
Paintings by Gustave Courbet